XHR-FM is a radio station on 105.7 FM in Linares, Nuevo León. It carries the La Caliente format from its owner, Multimedios Radio.

History
XELN-AM received its concession on April 1, 1969. Owned since day one by La Voz de Linares, S.A. (now the concessionaire for six Multimedios Radio stations including XHLN), it broadcast with 1,000 watts on 790 kHz. In the early 2000s, XELN moved to 830 in order to increase daytime power to 3,000 watts.

The station eventually was bought by Multimedios. Its transmitter facility is located with co-owned XHR-FM 104.9; the two have shared facilities since their AM days.

XELN was approved to move to FM in October 2011 but is unable to shut off its AM because it serves 4,011 people without any other radio service, according to a 2018 IFT study.

On July 9, 2018, Multimedios switched the callsigns of its two Linares stations, resulting in XHLN-FM being assigned to 104.9 and XHR-FM to 105.7. The content of the two frequencies remained unchanged. However, the associated AM to the 105.7 FM facility remains XELN-AM.

References

Radio stations in Nuevo León
Multimedios Radio
Radio stations in Mexico with continuity obligations